Ensifer numidicus is a nitrogen fixing symbiont of Fabaceae. gram-negative, aerobic, non-spore forming, rod-shaped bacterium of the family Rhizobiaceae. First described in 2010; more biovars have since been isolated and described with ORS 1407 considered the representative organism. Most examples have been found in arid and infra-arid regions of Tunisia.

Host plants 

Biovars has been shown to induce nodule formation in a wide variety of symbiosis competent plant species including Medicago Sativa(cultivated alfalfa), Lotus creticus, Syrian mesquite(Prosopis farcta), Lens culinaris Medikus ssp(lentils) as well as Cicer arietinum(chickpea) and Argyrolobium uniflorum.

Associated Biovars

Argyrolobium uniflorum: ORS 1407

cultivated alfalfa (Medicago sativa) :ORS 1407 

Lotus creticus: PT26, ORS 1410 

Cultivated lentils(Lens culinaris): ORS 1444

Cicer arietinum(chickpea):LBi2

Syrian mesquite(Prosopis farcta):PN14

Known relationships between cultivars

This phylogeny is based on a constrained analysis of the 16S ribosomal RNA

Genome 
16s RNA analysis has found Ensifer numidicus to be closely related to Ensifer medicae and Ensifer garamanticus. Analogous genes between closely related species suggests high levels of horizontal gene transfer between closely related species. Laboratory inoculation has shown Ensifer numidicus engages in indeterminate nodulation with host plants in at least some circumstances.

Growth conditions 

E. numidicus has been found to grow on yeast-mannitol medium at 28C with an upper limit of 40C. Laboratory cultivated strains have found metabolism of at least 13 substrates including dulcitol, D-lyxose, 1-O-methyl a-D-glucopyranoside, 3-O-methyl-D-glucopyranose, D-gluconate, L-histidine, succinate, fumarate, ethanolamine, DL-b-hydroxybutyrate, L-aspartate, L-alanine and propionate. Sensitivity has been found to salt concentrations greater than 4%. Due to similarities to other Ensifer species, it cannot be described by growth conditions alone and must be differentiated by genetic components.

References 

Rhizobiaceae
Symbiosis